Richard Jeffries Dawes DFC (23 October 1897–22 April 1983) was a Canadian World War I flying ace credited with nine aerial victories.

Early life
Richard Jeffries Dawes was born on 23 October 1897 in Lachine, Quebec, Canada. He joined the military for World War I, and ended up a Sopwith Camel pilot in the Royal Flying Corps.

World War I
By late 1917, Dawes was posted to 45 Squadron on the Western Front as a pilot. He scored his first aerial victory on the Western Front before 45 Squadron was transferred to Italy. He became an ace with the squadron. Then, at about the time the Royal Flying Corps was being consolidated into the Royal Air Force, Dawes was transferred for a short spell to 28 Squadron, which was also in Italy. He scored a victory with them before transferring back to 45 Squadron. He wrapped up his tally with a final three wins with the unit in June 1918. His courage earned him a Distinguished Flying Cross, which was gazetted on 21 September 1918:

List of aerial victories
See also Aerial victory standards of World War I

Post World War I
Richard Jeffries Dawes lived until 22 April 1983, though details of his postwar life are unknown. He died in Montreal, Quebec, Canada.

Endnotes

Reference
 

Canadian World War I flying aces
1983 deaths
1897 births
People from Lachine, Quebec
Royal Flying Corps officers
Recipients of the Distinguished Flying Cross (United Kingdom)